Axvall is a locality situated in Skara Municipality, Västra Götaland County, Sweden with 1,186 inhabitants in 2010.

See also
 Axevalla House (castle ruins)

References 

Populated places in Västra Götaland County
Populated places in Skara Municipality